St. Edmund's Church, Wootton is a parish church in the Church of England located in Wootton, Isle of Wight.

History

The church is medieval in origin.

It is now in the same parish as St. Mark's Church, Wootton, although the medieval parish only included a small part of what is now the larger settlement of Wootton Bridge. There was a detached portion of the parish at Chillerton.

The churchyard contains the Commonwealth war grave of a Hampshire Regiment soldier of World War I.

Organ

The pipe organ dates from 1869 and was originally installed in St Andrew's Church, Norton Green, near Freshwater. It was moved here in the early 1980s when that church became redundant. A specification of the organ can be found on the National Pipe Organ Register.

References

Church of England church buildings on the Isle of Wight
Grade II* listed churches on the Isle of Wight